Jana Schneider (born 2002) is a German chess player. She was awarded the title of FIDE Master in 2016.

Chess career

She qualified for the Women's Chess World Cup 2021, where she was defeated 2–0 by Medina Warda Aulia in the first round. She represented Germany as a reserve player in the 44th Chess Olympiad and scored 9 out of 10 points with a rating performance of 2414.

References

External links
 
 Jana Schneider chess games at 365Chess.com
 

2002 births
Living people
Chess FIDE Masters
German female chess players